Naima Samih (born 1953 in Derb Sultan, Casablanca, Morocco) is a Moroccan artist.

Born in a Saharawi family of thirteen children in Casablanca, Naima Samih started singing at the age of nine. She stopped school at an early age and worked with a seamstress to help her family, but gave up to take a chance for music. In the early seventies she got a breakthrough, taking part in the musical show "Mawahib" (a show that revealed Moroccan talents such as Samira Said, and Rajae Belmlih). She became a star in the 1970s with the release of her song "Jrit Ou Jarit" also known as "Yaka Jarhi". It became a hit throughout the Arab world, from North Africa all the way to the Persian Gulf region.

Unlike her fellow singers from Mawahib, she stayed in Morocco to pursue her career and not to go to Egypt, that was welcoming voices from across the Arab world to work with its leading composers and writers. "I think," she said, "that one can achieve success and reveal itself to the world without immigrating". Her Khaleeji song from Qatar, "Wagif Aala Babikom", was a huge success.

References

Living people
20th-century Moroccan women singers
People from Casablanca
1953 births